The St. Louis Cardinals are an American professional baseball team based in St. Louis. The Cardinals compete in Major League Baseball (MLB) as a member club of the National League (NL) Central division. Since the 2006 season, the Cardinals have played their home games at Busch Stadium in downtown St. Louis. One of the nation's oldest and most successful professional baseball clubs, the Cardinals have won 11 World Series championships, the most of any NL team and second in MLB only to the New York Yankees. The team has won 19 National League pennants, third-most of any team. St. Louis has also won 15 division titles in the East and Central divisions.

In 1881, entrepreneur Chris von der Ahe purchased the Brown Stockings barnstorming club, renamed it the St. Louis Browns, and made it a charter member of the American Association baseball league. The team won four league championships, qualifying them to play in the era's professional baseball championship series, a forerunner of the modern World Series. In two of these championships, the Browns met the Chicago White Stockings, now the Chicago Cubs, launching the enduring Cardinals–Cubs rivalry.

In 1892, the Browns – also called the Perfectos – joined the National League. In 1900, the team was renamed the Cardinals. (Two years later, an unrelated St. Louis Browns team joined the American League.)

Notable Cardinals achievements include manager/owner Branch Rickey's invention of the farm system, Rogers Hornsby's two batting Triple Crowns, Dizzy Dean's 30-win season in 1934, Stan Musial's 17 MLB and 29 NL records, Bob Gibson's 1.12 earned run average (ERA) in 1968, Whitey Herzog's Whiteyball, Mark McGwire's single-season home run record in 1998, the 2011 championship team's unprecedented comebacks, and Albert Pujols’ 700th home run.  The Cardinals have won 105 or more games in four seasons and won 100 or more nine times. Cardinals players have won 21 league MVPs, four batting Triple Crowns, and three Cy Young Awards. Baseball Hall of Fame inductees include Lou Brock, Dizzy Dean, Bob Gibson, Whitey Herzog, Rogers Hornsby, Joe Medwick, Stan Musial, Enos Slaughter, Branch Rickey, Red Schoendienst, Ozzie Smith, Ted Simmons, and Bruce Sutter.

In 2018, Forbes valued the Cardinals at $1.9  billion, the 7th-highest among MLB clubs and far more than the $147 million paid in 1995 by owner William DeWitt, Jr.'s investment group. In 2017, the team took in revenue of $319 million on an operating income of $40.0 million. John Mozeliak is the President of Baseball Operations, Mike Girsch is the general manager and Oliver Marmol is the manager. The Cardinals are renowned for their strong fan support: despite being in one of the sport's mid-level markets, they routinely see attendances among the league's highest, and are consistently among the top three in MLB in local television ratings.

Through 2022, the Cardinals' all-time win-loss record is 11,131–10,232.

History

Before the Cardinals (1875–1881)
Professional baseball began in St. Louis with the inception of the Brown Stockings in the National Association (NA) in 1875. The NA folded following that season, and the next season, St. Louis joined the National League as a charter member, finishing in third place at 45–19. George Bradley hurled the first no-hitter in Major League history. The NL expelled St. Louis from the league after 1877 due to a game-fixing scandal and the team went bankrupt. Without a league, they continued play as a semi-professional barnstorming team through 1881.

The magnitudes of the reorganizations, following the 1877 and 1881 seasons, are such that the 1875–1877 and 1878–1881 Brown Stockings teams are not generally considered to share continuity as a franchise with the current St. Louis Cardinals.

American Association and early National League eras (1882–1919)

For the 1882 season, Chris von der Ahe purchased the team, reorganized it, and made it a founding member of the American Association (AA), a league to rival the NL. 1882 is generally considered to be the first year of existence for the franchise which would later become known as the St. Louis Cardinals.

The next season, St. Louis shortened their name to the Browns. Soon thereafter they became the dominant team in the AA, as manager Charlie Comiskey guided St. Louis to four pennants in a row from 1885 to 1888. Pitcher and outfielder Bob Caruthers led the league in ERA (2.07) and wins (40) in 1885 and finished in the top six in both in each of the following two seasons. He also led the AA in OBP (.448) and OPS (.974) in 1886 and finished fourth in batting average in 1886 (.334) and fifth in 1887 (.357). Outfielder Tip O'Neill won the first batting triple crown in franchise history in 1887 and the only one in AA history. By winning the pennant, the Browns played the NL pennant winner in a predecessor of the World Series. The Browns twice met the Chicago White Stockings — the predecessor to the Chicago Cubs — tying one in a heated dispute and winning the other, thus spurring the vigorous St. Louis-Chicago rivalry that ensues to this day. During the franchise's ten seasons in the AA, they compiled an all-time league-high of 780 wins and .639 winning percentage. They lost just 432 contests while tying 21 others.

The AA went bankrupt after the 1891 season and the Browns transferred to the National League. This time, the club entered an era of stark futility. Between 1892 and 1919, St. Louis managed just five winning seasons, finished in last or next-to-last place sixteen times, and ended four seasons with 100 losses or more. The nadir was the 1897 season: a 29–102 record for a franchise-worst .221 winning percentage. St. Louis' 84–67 finish as the Perfectos in 1899 would be the team's best finish between the AA era and Sam Breadon's purchase of the team. As the "Perfectos", the team wore their jersey with a cardinal red trim and sock striping. Later that season, St. Louis Republic sportswriter Willie McHale included an account in a column of a female fan he heard remarking about the uniforms, "What a lovely shade of cardinal." Fans liked the moniker "Cardinals" and, the next year in 1900, popularity for the nickname induced an official change to Cardinals.

In 1902, an American League team moved from Milwaukee into St. Louis, renamed themselves the St. Louis Browns and built a new park on the site of the Cardinals' old stadium, striking a rivalry that lasted five decades. Breadon bought a minority interest in the Cardinals in 1917 and in 1919 Browns manager Branch Rickey joined the Cardinals. The Cardinals' first 28 seasons in the NL were a complete reversal of their stay in the AA – with a .406 winning percentage, they compiled 1,632 wins, 2,425 losses and 74 ties.

Breadon era (1920–1952)

St. Louis baseball commenced a renaissance: since 1926 the Cardinals have won eleven World Series and nineteen NL pennants. Breadon spurred this revival when he bought out the majority stake in 1920 and appointed Rickey as business manager, who expanded scouting, player development, and pioneered the minor league farm system, filling the role of today's general manager. With Rogers Hornsby at second base, he claimed Triple Crowns in 1922 and 1925, and the Cardinals won the 1926 World Series, their first. St. Louis then won the league in 1928, 1930, and 1931 and the 1931 World Series.

The Gashouse Gang edition claimed the 1934 World Series and the Cardinals amassed new thresholds of popularity far outside St. Louis via radio, which led to the coining of the term "Cardinal Nation." Dizzy Dean led the Gang, winning the 1934 MVP, and leading the NL multiple times in wins, strikeouts, innings, complete games and shutouts. Johnny Mize and Joe Medwick emerged as two power threats, with Medwick claiming the last Triple Crown for a Cardinal in 1937.

In the 1940s, a golden era emerged as Rickey's farm system became laden with such talent as Marty Marion, Enos Slaughter, Mort Cooper, Walker Cooper, Stan Musial, Max Lanier, Whitey Kurowski, Red Schoendienst and Johnny Beazley. It was one of the most successful decades in franchise history with 960 wins and 580 losses for a winning percentage higher than any other Major League team at .623. With Billy Southworth managing, they won the World Series in 1942 and 1944 (in the only all-St. Louis series against the Browns), and won 105 or more games each in 1942, 1943, and 1944. Southworth's managerial winning percentage (.642) is St. Louis' highest since the franchise joined the National League. Musial was considered the most consistent hitter of his era and most accomplished in team history, winning three MVPs and seven batting titles. St. Louis then won the 1946 World Series on Slaughter's Mad Dash in Game 7. Breadon was forced to sell the team in 1947 but won six World Series and nine NL pennants as Cardinals owner. They remained competitive, finishing .500 or better in thirteen of the next seventeen seasons, but fell short of winning the league or World Series until 1964.

Gussie Busch era (1953–1989)

In 1953 the Anheuser-Busch brewery bought the Cardinals and August "Gussie" Busch became team president, spurring the Browns' departure in 1953 to Baltimore to become the Orioles, and making the Cardinals the only major league club in town. More success followed in the 1960s, starting with what is considered one of the most lopsided trades in Major League history, as St. Louis received outfielder Lou Brock from the Cubs for pitcher Ernie Broglio. MVP third baseman Ken Boyer and pitcher Bob Gibson led the club to a World Series win the same year and Curt Flood, Bill White, Curt Simmons, and Steve Carlton also made key contributions in this decade. In 1967, new arrival Orlando Cepeda won the MVP, helping to propel St. Louis to the World Series. The Cardinals won the league the following year behind their Major League-leading 2.49 staff ERA in what was an all-round record-breaking season of pitching dominance.   Posting a modern-day record low ERA of 1.12 and striking out a one-game World Series-record of 17, Gibson won both the MVP and Cy Young awards that year. However, the Cardinals failed to repeat as World Series champions, blowing a 3–1 lead to the underdog Detroit Tigers.

In the 1970s, catcher/third baseman Joe Torre and first baseman Keith Hernández each won MVPs, but the team's best finishes were second place and 90 wins. The team found their way back to the World Series three times in the 1980s, starting with manager Whitey Herzog and his Whiteyball style of play and another trade that altered course of the franchise: in 1982, shortstop Garry Templeton was shipped to the Padres for fellow shortstop Ozzie Smith. Widely regarded as one of the best defensive players in history, Smith ranks first all-time among shortstops in Gold Glove Awards (13), All-Star games (15), assists (8,375), and double plays (1,590). St. Louis won the 1982 World Series from the Milwaukee Brewers that fall. The Cardinals again won the league in 1985 and 1987. In the 1985 Series, they faced-off with cross-state rivals Kansas City Royals for the first time in a non-exhibition game, but they lost the series after a controversial call in Game 6; the 1987 series saw them face off against the Minnesota Twins, but could only win all three of their games played at home in the seven-game series.

Bill DeWitt era (1996–present)

After Gussie Busch died in 1989, the brewery took control and hired Joe Torre to manage late in 1990, then sold the team to an investment group led by William DeWitt, Jr. in 1996. Tony La Russa replaced Torre in the spring of 1996. In 1998, Mark McGwire competed with the Cubs' Sammy Sosa for a barrage of home runs in their pursuit of the single-season home run record. From 2000 to 2013, the Cardinals reestablished their way to the top with ten playoff appearances, four NL pennants, two World Series titles and 1,274 regular season wins against 993 losses for a .560 winning percentage, leading the National League and second in MLB only to the New York Yankees. With the addition of Jim Edmonds, Albert Pujols, and Scott Rolen, the Cardinals featured three prominent sluggers and defenders nicknamed "MV3;" Pujols won three MVPs and hit .328 with 445 home runs in his Cardinals career. In 2004, playoff stalwart Chris Carpenter's 3.09 ERA and 15 wins helped power the team to a major-league best 105 wins and take the NL pennant. In 2006, beset with injuries and inconsistency, they won the World Series, beating Detroit in five games to set an all-time record-low of 83 wins for a World Series winner.

In 2009, the Cardinals reached 10,000 wins, dating to when they first played in the American Association (AA). St. Louis returned to the playoffs in 2011, first surmounting the largest games-won deficit after 130 games (at 10.5) to upstage the Atlanta Braves on the final day for the wild card playoff berth. In Game 3 of the World Series, Pujols became just the third player to hit three home runs in a World Series game. In Game 6, third baseman David Freese and outfielder Lance Berkman each tied the score on the Cardinals' final strike — the first such occurrence in any game in MLB history — and St. Louis defeated the Texas Rangers later that game with a walk-off home run from Freese. After winning that Series, La Russa retired and became the only manager to do so after winning a title. He also finished with the most wins for managers in franchise history with 1,408.

La Russa's successor, Mike Matheny, helped extend St. Louis' playoff run as he became the first manager in the division play era to guide the Cardinals to the NLCS and playoffs in his first two seasons. In 2014, the Cardinals extended their NLCS streak to 4, with their 3–1 series victory over the Dodgers, in the NLDS. Ten days after being eliminated from the postseason by the San Francisco Giants, rookie outfielder Oscar Taveras was killed in a car accident while traveling to his hometown Puerto Plata in the Dominican Republic. On November 17, they acquired Atlanta Braves right-fielder Jason Heyward (who had just come off a Gold Glove-winning season) to replace Taveras. On June 16, 2015, the FBI and the Justice Department started an investigation on the Cardinals for possibly hacking the Houston Astros. The hacking incident was perpetrated by Scouting Director Chris Correa. For the first time since the 2007–2008 seasons, the Cardinals missed the playoffs in consecutive years, 2016–2017.

On July 14, 2018, following an 8–2 loss to the Cincinnati Reds, the St. Louis Cardinals announced they had dismissed manager Mike Matheny after  seasons. The team then named Mike Shildt interim manager, and he was made the permanent manager a month later.

On November 19, 2018, the team announced that the "Victory Blue" uniforms, worn by the Cardinals during the late 1970s and 1980s, would be returning for the 2019 season. The uniforms, integrating the powder blue color with the team's current "Saturday alternate" jersey design, were to be worn 13 times on the road during the 2019 season. The Cardinals acquired Paul Goldschmidt in a trade from the Arizona Diamondbacks on December 5, 2018.

On September 14, 2022, long-time starting pitcher Adam Wainwright and catcher Yadier Molina set the NL/AL record for most starts as pitcher and catcher duo, also referred to as a battery, at 325 starts together going back to 2007. The previous record holding duo, Mickey Lolich and Bill Freehan, had held the record since 1975.

Ballpark

The Cardinals play their home games at Busch Stadium (also referred to as New Busch Stadium or Busch III) in downtown St. Louis, straddling 7th and Clark near the intersection of Interstates 64, 55, and 44. The stadium opened for the 2006 season at a cost of $411 million and holds a normal capacity of 46,861. The Cardinals finished their inaugural season in the new Busch Stadium by winning the 2006 World Series, the first team to do so since the New York Yankees in 1923. This open-air stadium emulates the HOK Sport (now Populous)-designed "retro-style" baseball-only parks built since the 1990s. The open panoramic perspective over the outfield wall offers a remarkable view of St. Louis' downtown skyline featuring the distinctive Gateway Arch. A replica of the Eads Bridge spans the entrance to the park on the third base side, while the statue of Stan Musial arises in front of that entrance. Other statues at the corner of 8th and Clark include Hall of Famers Rogers Hornsby, Ozzie Smith, George Sisler, Cool Papa Bell, Bob Gibson, Jack Buck, and others.

Due to increased demand, Game 7 of the 2011 World Series accommodated a baseball record of 47,399 by increasing the number of standing room only tickets. The attendance record for any sporting event is 48,263, in a 2013 association football (soccer) friendly match between Chelsea F.C. and Manchester City F.C., made possible by on field seating. The largest attendance (53,000) of any event at Busch belongs to U2 during a concert from their 360° Tour in 2011.

Ballpark Village, a mixed-use development located across Clark Street from Busch Stadium, is targeted to enhance the ballpark goers' experience. Phase 1 of the development, completed for the start of the 2014 season, includes entertainment venues, restaurants, and retail. Anchored by Cardinals Nation (which includes the Cardinals Hall of Fame, a two-story Cardinals-themed restaurant and rooftop seating for 300+ fans with views of the field across the street), a  Budweiser Brew House, FOX Sports Midwest Live! and PBR, the $100 million phase 1 development of Ballpark Village is intended to be a gathering space throughout the year, not just during the baseball season.

Previous ballparks
Busch Stadium is the Cardinals' fourth home ballpark and the third to bear that name. The Cardinals' original home ballpark was Sportsman's Park from 1882 to 1892 when they played in the American Association and were known as the Browns. In 1893, the Browns moved to a new ballpark five blocks northwest of Sportsman's Park which would serve as their home from 1893 to 1920. The new park was originally called New Sportsman's Park but became more commonly referred to as Robison Field. Midway through the 1920 season, the Cardinals abandoned Robison Field and returned to the original Sportsman's Park and became tenants of their American League rivals, the St. Louis Browns. In 1953, the Anheuser-Busch Brewery purchased the Cardinals and the new owner subsequently also purchased Sportsman's Park from the Browns and renamed it Busch Stadium, later becoming Busch I. The Browns then left St. Louis for Baltimore after the season, becoming the Orioles. The Cardinals built Busch Memorial Stadium, or Busch II, in downtown St. Louis, opened it during the 1966 season and played there until 2005. It was built as the multi-purpose stadium home of both the baseball Cardinals and the NFL football Cardinals, who are now the Arizona Cardinals; the NFL's Rams also played the first four games of their home schedule upon their arrival in St. Louis in 1995. The current Busch Stadium was constructed adjacent to, and partly atop, the site of Busch Memorial Stadium.

Spring training
The Cardinals home field in spring training is Roger Dean Stadium in Jupiter, Florida. They share the complex, which opened in 1998, with the Miami Marlins. Before moving to Jupiter, the Cardinals hosted spring training at Al Lang Field in St. Petersburg, Florida from 1937 to 1997.

Regular season home attendance
The Cardinals have exceeded the attendance total of 3 million every season since 2004. Every season since 2013, the Cardinals have finished second among MLB franchises in home game attendance, surpassed only by the Los Angeles Dodgers each season.

Logos and uniforms

The Cardinals have had few logos throughout their history, although those logos have evolved over time. The first logo associated with the Cardinals was an interlocking "SL" that appeared on the team's caps and or sleeves as early as 1900. Those early uniforms usually featured the name "St. Louis" on white home and gray road uniforms which both had cardinal red accents. In 1920, the "SL" largely disappeared from the team's uniforms, and for the next 20 years the team wore caps that were white with red striping and a red bill.

In 1922, the Cardinals wore uniforms for the first time that featured the two familiar cardinal birds perched on a baseball bat over the name "Cardinals" with the letter "C" of the word hooked over the bat. The concept of the birds originated after general manager Branch Rickey noticed a colorful cardboard arrangement featuring cardinal birds on a table in a Presbyterian church in Ferguson, Missouri, at which he was speaking. The arrangement's production was by a woman named Allie May Schmidt. Schmidt's father, a graphic designer, helped Rickey make the logo a familiar staple on Cardinals uniforms. Colloquially referred to as the "birds on the bat", it initially appeared with the birds perched on a black bat and "Cardinals" in printed letters. An alternate version of this logo with "St. Louis" replacing "Cardinals" appeared in 1930 and was the primary logo in 1931 and 1932 before "Cardinals" returned. In 1940, the now-familiar "" logo was introduced on the team's caps. The interlocking "" has undergone several slight modifications over the years but has appeared on the team's caps every year since. The first appearance of the "STL" in 1940 coincided with the introduction of navy blue as a uniform color. From 1940 until 1955, the team wore navy blue caps with red bills and a red interlocking "" while the jerseys featured both cardinal red and navy blue accents. In 1951, the "birds on the bat" logo was changed to feature a yellow baseball bat.

In 1956, the Cardinals changed their caps to solid blue with a red "", removing the red bill. Also, for that season only, the Cardinals wore a script "Cardinals" wordmark on their uniforms excluding the "birds on the bat." An updated version of the "birds on the bat" logo returned in 1957 with the word "Cardinals" written in cursive beneath the bat; this logo, with some incremental changes along the way, has been the team's logo since. In 1962, the Cardinals became the first National League team (and the second in all of Major League Baseball after the Chicago White Sox in 1960) to display players' names on the back of their jerseys. In 1964, while retaining their blue caps for road games, the Cardinals changed their home caps to all red with a white interlocking "". The next year, the red caps were the only cap worn by the team full-time. In 1967, the birds on the bat emblem on the jersey was again tweaked, making the birds more realistic and changing the position of their tails relative to the bat and this version remained on all Cardinals game jerseys through 1997.

In 1971, following the trend in baseball at the time, the Cardinals replaced the traditional flannel front-button shirts and pants with belts with new pullover knit jerseys and beltless elastic waist pants. In 1973, the crew-neck collar became a V-neck. Another trend in baseball led the Cardinals to change their road uniforms from gray to light blue from 1976 to 1984; the player numbers were worn on the sleeves in 1979 and 1980. In 1992, the Cardinals returned to wearing traditional button-down shirts and pants with belts. That same year, they also brought back the all-navy cap with a red "", which were last worn in 1964, for use on the road only while wearing the same red and white cap for home games.

In 1998, the "birds on the bat" was updated for the first time in 30 years with more detailed birds and bolder letters. That year, St. Louis introduced a cap featuring a single cardinal bird perched on a bat worn for Sunday home games only. Up until 2020, the alternate "bird" caps were paired with their primary "" red batting helmets, but in the 2021 season, the Cardinals added a new helmet to match their home Sunday alternate caps. The new birds on the bat design was modified again the next year, with yellow beaks and white eyes replacing the red beaks and yellow eyes of the 1998 version. Uniform numbers also returned to the front of the jerseys in 1999 after a two-year absence.

On November 16, 2012, the Cardinals unveiled a new alternate uniform to be worn at home games on Saturdays beginning with the 2013 season. The modified jersey, cream-colored with red trim on the sleeves and down the front, retains the "birds on the bat" but is the first since 1932 in which "St. Louis" is used instead of "Cardinals". 2013 also saw the team adopt their red caps as their main cap for both home and away games for the first time since 1991; the navy cap was retained as an alternate, used when visiting other teams with red home caps.

Starting with the 2019 season, the Cardinals have worn updated powder blue alternate uniforms during Saturday road games. Like the Saturday home cream alternates, it features red piping and "St. Louis" below the "birds on the bat" logo. In 2020, the Cardinals introduced a slightly updated version of their "" cap logo, which was "soft launched" in 2019 via their social media accounts and game broadcasts.

Support

Fans

Mascots

The team mascot is an anthropomorphic cardinal wearing the team's uniform named Fredbird. He is assisted by Team Fredbird, a group of eleven women who entertain fans from the field and on top of the dugouts.

While unofficial, the Rally Squirrel became an unexpected phenomenon during the 2011 postseason. Making its "debut" in Game 3 of the NLDS on October 4, a squirrel ran across home plate in the middle of a pitch from Roy Oswalt of the Phillies to the Cardinals' Skip Schumaker. The Cardinals would win Game 4 and subsequently Game 5 (October 7) in Philadelphia to advance to the NLCS, symbolizing the squirrel's "role" in the victory. The squirrel was popularized as "Buschie the Rally Squirrel". As a tribute to the popularity of the squirrel, a small depiction of the Rally Squirrel is also included on the official World Series rings the team received. It shows up under the "STL" logo on the side of the ring.

Fredbird sparked controversy in May 2015, when he was asked by a fan for a photograph and handed him a sign that said "Police Lives Matter". The team later claimed that Fredbird should not be involved in any political activity or social commentary.

Rivalries

Chicago Cubs 

The Cardinals–Cubs rivalry refers to games between the Cardinals and the Chicago Cubs. The rivalry is also known as the Downstate Illinois rivalry or the I-55 Series (in earlier years as the Route 66 Series) as both cities are located along Interstate 55 (which itself succeeded the famous U.S. Route 66). The Cubs lead the series 1,253–1,196, through October 2021, while the Cardinals lead in National League pennants with 19 against the Cubs' 17. The Cubs have won 11 of those pennants in Major League Baseball's Modern Era (1901–present), while all 19 of the Cardinals' pennants have been won since 1926. The Cardinals also have an edge when it comes to World Series successes, having won 11 championships to the Cubs' 3. Games featuring the Cardinals and Cubs see numerous visiting fans in either Busch Stadium in St. Louis or Wrigley Field in Chicago. When the National League split into two and then three divisions, the Cardinals and Cubs remained together. This has added excitement to several pennant races over the years. The Cardinals and Cubs have played each other once in the postseason, 2015 National League Division Series, which the Cubs won 3–1.

Kansas City Royals 

The Cardinals have an interleague and intrastate rivalry with the Kansas City Royals, dubbed the "Show-Me Series" after the nickname of the team's home state, Missouri; or the "I–70 Series" after the interstate highway that connects the cities. The teams first met in the 1985 World Series, which the Royals won 4–3, and which remains their only post-season meeting.

As of 2021, the Cardinals lead the overall series 71–50.

The rivalry heated up in 2015, when both teams held the best records in their respective leagues when they opened each of their two series. Had the Cardinals made it to the World Series, they would have faced the Royals in a rematch.

Los Angeles Dodgers 

Primarily a playoff rivalry; since 1892, The Cardinals and Dodgers have met 6 times in the postseason with 2 meetings in the NLCS falling in favor of the Cardinals. Both teams have recently grown a history of animosity towards one another since the late 2000s as both teams often met frequently in the postseason. The Dodgers have not fared as well against the Cardinals in the postseason. In five prior postseason series matchups, the Cardinals have won four with the Dodgers winning only the 2009 NLDS and the 2021 National League Wild Card Game.

Executives and club officials

Ownership and valuation
An investment group led by William DeWitt, Jr. owns the St. Louis Cardinals, having bought the team from Anheuser-Busch (AB) in 1996. As with other periods of the Cardinals' transaction history, doubt loomed as to whether the purchaser would keep the team in St. Louis, due to the city's status as a "small market", which appears to handicap a club's competitiveness. Such was the case when Sam Breadon put the Cardinals up for sale in 1947: then-NL President Ford Frick proposed moving the Cardinals to Chicago. When AB placed the Cardinals for sale in 1995, they publicly expressed intention to find a buyer who would keep the club in St. Louis. In March 1996, AB sold the team for $147 million to a partnership headed by Southwest Bank's Drew Baur, Hanser and DeWitt, Jr. Civic Center Redevelopment, a subsidiary of AB, held the parking garages and adjacent property and also transferred them to the Baur ownership group. Baur's group then sold the garages to another investment group, lowering the net franchise purchase price to about $100 million, about $10 million less than Financial World's value of the team at the time $110 million.

Current Cincinnati Reds owners Bob Castellini and brothers Thomas Williams and W. Joseph Williams Jr. each once owned a stake in the Cardinals dating back to the Baur-DeWitt group's purchase of the team. To allow their purchase of the Reds in 2005, the rest of the group bought out Castellini's and the Williams brothers' shares, totaling an estimated 13 percent. At that time, the Forbes valued the Cardinals at about $370 million. However, after reabsorbing that stake into the remainder of the group, they decided to make it available to new investors in 2010. Amid later allegations that the Cardinals owed the city profit shares, DeWitt revealed that their profitability had not reached the threshold to trigger that obligation.

Recent annual financial records
As of 2018, Forbes valued the Cardinals seventh among 30 MLB franchises. Their estimated value of $1.90 billion was an increase of $100 million from the season before, when they ranked seventh. St. Louis' revenue in 2018 was $319 million, up $9 million. Their Operating income was $40.0 million. The Cardinals' deal with Fox Sports Midwest, signed in 2015, begins in 2018, and is worth $1 billion through 2032. In 2014, Forbes valued the Cardinals at $820 million and opined previously that they play "in the best single-team baseball market in the country and are among the league's leaders in television ratings and attendance every season." Concurrent with the growth of Major League Baseball, the Cardinals value has increased significantly since the Baur-DeWitt purchase. In 2000, the franchise was valued at $219 million, a growth rate of 374% through 2014. The franchise's value grew 12.7% from 2013 to 2014.
The Forbes methodology of team values are enterprise values (equity plus net debt) that include the economics of the ballpark but exclude the value of real estate itself. Forbes does not include the value of team-owned regional sports networks. The league's ownership in Major League Baseball Advanced Media (100%) and the MLB Network (67%) and league's investment portfolio are included in our values. In total, these three assets constitute about $425 million in value for each team. Revenue and operating income (earnings before interest, taxes, depreciation and amortization) measure cash in versus cash out (not accrual accounting) for the 2017 season. Their figures include the post-season and are net of revenue sharing and stadium debt payments. Revenues include the pro-rated upfront bonuses networks pay teams as well as proceeds from non-MLB events at the ballpark. The non-recurring $18 million each team received in 2017 from the sale of a stake in BamTech to Walt Disney was excluded, as were profits or losses from team-owned RSNs.

All valuations per Forbes.
1 Based on current stadium deal (unless new stadium is pending) without deduction for debt, other than stadium debt. 
  (2018: market $715 mil., stadium $447 mil., sport $493 mil., brand management $245 mil.) 
  (2017: market $666 mil., stadium $411 mil., sport $488 mil., brand management $235 mil.) 
  (2016: market $613 mil., stadium $378 mil., sport $406 mil., brand management $219 mil.) 
  (2015: market $548 mil., stadium $338 mil., sport $331 mil., brand management $197 mil.) 
  (2014: market $339 mil., stadium $211 mil., sport $156 mil., brand management $124 mil.) 
  (2013: market $291 mil., stadium $182 mil., sport $151 mil., brand management $91 mil.)  
 (2012: market $240 mil., stadium $157 mil., sport $119 mil., brand management $78 mil.) 
 (2011: market $206 mil., stadium $136 mil., sport $111 mil., brand management $65 mil.)

2 Net of stadium revenues used for debt payments. 
3 Earnings before interest, taxes, depreciation and amortization. 
4 Includes benefits and bonuses. 
5 Compares the number of wins per player payroll relative to the rest of MLB. Playoff wins count twice as much as regular season wins. A score of 120 means that the team achieved 20% more victories per dollar of payroll compared with the league average in 2010.

Other interests
The Cardinals own four of their six Minor League Baseball affiliates:
 Springfield Cardinals, Texas League
 Palm Beach Cardinals, Florida State League
 FCL Cardinals, Florida Complex League
 DSL Cardinals, Dominican Summer League

Executives
Franchise Principals
 Chairman & CEO: William DeWitt Jr.
 President: Bill DeWitt III
 Sr. Vice President & General Counsel: Mike Whittle
 Vice President, Business Development: Dan Good

Baseball Operations
 President of Baseball Operations: John Mozeliak
 Vice President & General Manager: Mike Girsch
 Assistant General Manager: Moisés Rodríguez
 Assistant General Manager & Director of Scouting: Randy Flores
 Assistant General Manager & Director of Player Development: Gary LaRocque
 Special Assistant to GM/Player Procurement: Matt Slater
 Director, Baseball Administration: John Vuch

Cardinals Care & Community Relations
 Vice President, Community Relations & Exec. Director, Cardinals Care: Michael Hall

Event Services and Merchandising
 Vice President, Event Services & Merchandising: Vicki Bryant

Finance and Administration
 Sr. Vice President & CFO: Brad Wood

Stadium Operations
 Vice President, Stadium Operations: Matt Gifford

Ticket Sales, Marketing & Corporate Sales
 Senior Vice President, Sales and Marketing: Dan Farrell
 Vice President, Corporate Sales & Broadcasting: Thane vanBreusegen
 Vice President, Ticket Sales: Joe Strohm

Managers

Field managers with one or more years managing, and the current manager are included here. 

Table key
  *All-time franchise leader. ** Franchise leader since 1900.

Players

Current roster

Coaching staff

Selected individual achievements and awards

 Darryl Kile Award: Two awards are presented each year, one to a St. Louis Cardinal and one to a Houston Astro, each of whom exemplifies Kile's virtues of being "a good teammate, a great friend, a fine father and a humble man." The winner is selected by each local chapter of the Baseball Writers' Association of America. See: .
No-hitters: Cardinal pitchers have thrown 10 no-hitters: Ted Breitenstein (1891), Jesse Haines (1924), Paul Dean (1934), Lon Warneke (1941), Ray Washburn (1968), Bob Gibson (1971), Bob Forsch (1978 and 1983), José Jiménez (1999), and Bud Smith (2001). The Cardinals have never been involved in a perfect game, win or lose.
 Cy Young Awards: Two Cardinal pitchers have won Cy Young Awards: Bob Gibson in 1968 and 1970, and Chris Carpenter in 2005.
 MVP Awards: 17 different Cardinal players have won a total of 21 Most Valuable Player awards, the most recent being Paul Goldschmidt in 2022. Albert Pujols and Stan Musial have collected the most MVPs with three apiece. Bob Gibson won both the Cy Young Award and the MVP award in 1968. The Cardinals are second only to the New York Yankees' 22 MVP awards.
 Rookie of the Year: Six Cardinals have won the Rookie of the Year award: Wally Moon in 1954, Bill Virdon in 1955, Bake McBride in 1974, Vince Coleman in 1985, Todd Worrell in 1986, and Albert Pujols in 2001.
 Hitting for the cycle: 19 different Cardinal players have hit for the cycle for a total of 21 times, the most recent being Nolan Arenado in 2022.

 Triple Crown: Four of the 16 batting Triple Crowns in the major leagues (including three of only six in the National League) were by Cardinals. Tip O'Neill won the only American Association Triple Crown and the first in franchise history in 1887. Rogers Hornsby became the only two-time winner in NL history when he did it in 1922 and 1925 (Ted Williams won two AL Triple Crowns). Joe Medwick's Triple Crown in 1937 is the last in the history of the National League. Hornsby's 1925 numbers led the entire major leagues, making him one of only five players to have won this expanded Triple Crown.
 Home runs and RBI in a game: Jim Bottomley drove in 12 runs against Brooklyn on September 16, 1924, an all-time MLB single-game record that still stands. On September 7, 1993, Mark Whiten tied that record and another MLB single-game record with four home runs.
 Four home runs in a row by consecutive batters: Nolan Arenado, Nolan Gorman, Juan Yepez, and Dylan Carlson hit consecutive home runs on July 2, 2022, off starting pitcher Kyle Gibson of the Phillies. This feat has only occurred eleven times in the history of Major League Baseball.
 Two grand slams in a single inning: Fernando Tatís is the only player in Major League history to hit two grand slam home runs in the same inning, on April 23, 1999. Both were against Chan Ho Park of the Dodgers.

Team captains
Leo Durocher 1934–1937
Terry Moore 1942–1948
Ken Boyer 1959–1965
Ted Simmons and Reggie Smith 1976
Yadier Molina 2020-2022

Hall of Famers

Inducted into the National Baseball Hall of Fame and Museum

St. Louis Cardinals Hall of Fame Museum

In 2014, the Cardinals announced the reopening of the franchise Hall of Fame after a 6-year hiatus. A formal selection process recognizes former players as Cardinals Hall of Famers each year. To be eligible for election, a player must have been a member of the Cardinals for at least three seasons. The team initially released the names of 22 former players and personnel included in the inaugural class of 2014. There are now 50 members of the Cardinals Hall of Fame.

Positions that are listed were played the equivalent of a full season for the Cardinals.

Players who have been nominated, but not inducted, include Joaquín Andújar, Steve Carlton, David Freese, George Hendrick, Matt Morris, Édgar Rentería, and Lee Smith.

Inducted into the Missouri Sports Hall of Fame

Retired numbers

The Cardinals have retired 13 total jersey numbers––second in MLB only to the New York Yankees' 22––in honoring 15 total former players and club personnel on the left field wall at Busch Stadium. A 16th, Jackie Robinson, is honored by all MLB teams. For the majority of Rogers Hornsby's career, the Cardinals did not have any numbers on their uniforms. When the Cardinals experimented with numbers on uniforms in 1923, Hornsby briefly donned the number 4. He switched to 6 the following season before the team abandoned the practice. Upon his return to the team in 1933, Hornsby again wore number 4 before being traded later that year. The club opted to simply honor his name with no number attached to him in 1997.

Notes:
 Hornsby: When honored in 1997, '"SL"' was used in place of a number as he played mostly in an era without numbers.

 42: Jackie Robinson's number 42 was retired throughout baseball in 1997. The Cardinals again retired 42 in September 2006 in honor of Sutter, who was elected to the Hall of Fame earlier in the year.
 85: Cardinal stockholders honored Busch with the number 85 on his 85th birthday in 1984.

Out of circulation, but not officially retired
  4: Yadier Molina's (C, 2004–2022) number has not been reissued since he retired after the 2022 season, and will likely be officially retired soon.
  5: Albert Pujols's (1B, 2001–2011, 2022) number has not been reissued since he retired after the 2022 season, and will likely be officially retired soon.
  51: Willie McGee's (OF, 1982–1990, 1996–1999; Coach, 2018–present) number has not been reissued since late in the 2001 season. McGee became a coach on the Cardinals' staff in the 2018 season and was reissued the number.

Cardinals records

Minor league affiliations

The St. Louis Cardinals farm system consists of six minor league affiliates.

Radio and television coverage

Radio

In St. Louis, Audacy-owned KMOX (1120 AM) airs Cardinals games over radio and feeds the rest of the Cardinals network. Capable of reaching 21 million listeners in nine states including Missouri, Illinois, Arkansas, Indiana, Iowa, Kentucky, Mississippi, Oklahoma, and Tennessee, the Cardinals radio network is the second-largest in MLB with 117 affiliate stations.

Ricky Horton and John Rooney alternate as play-by-play announcers, with Matt Pauley serving as pre-game and post-game host. KMOX's 50,000-watt clear-channel signal covers much of the continental United States at night. At one time, owing to the Cardinals' status as a "regional" franchise, the Cardinals radio network reached almost half of the country.

The 2011 season marked the Cardinals' return to KMOX following five seasons on KTRS (550 AM), a station which is 50 percent owned by the Cardinals. With a partnership spanning seven decades, and continuously since 1954, its conclusion was realized after the 2005 season when the then owners of KMOX, CBS Radio, and the Cardinals failed to reach terms on a new rights agreement. However, frustrated by the underpowered coverage of 5,000-watt KTRS, the Cardinals reached a new deal with KMOX in 2011.

Starting in 2013 (at age 74), Mike Shannon started reducing his workload. As of the 2016 season, he only called home games for the Cardinals. As of the 2019 season, his 47th in the broadcast booth, he surpassed Jack Buck, his long-time broadcast companion, as the longest-tenured Cardinal broadcaster.

On January 14, 2021, Shannon announced that the upcoming season, his 50th season in the broadcast booth, would be his last.

Television
Since 2000, Cardinals telecasts have generated the top three in ratings in MLB every season. Bally Sports Midwest airs all games in high-definition and is the team's exclusive television broadcaster, with the exception of selected Saturday afternoon games on Fox (via its St. Louis affiliate, KTVI) or Sunday Night Baseball on ESPN. Bally Sports Indiana, Bally Sports South, Bally Sports Oklahoma, Bally Sports Southwest, and Bally Sports Southeast air Cardinals games for fans living within the Cardinals broadcast territory who do not receive the Bally Sports Midwest channel. During the 2016 season, the Cardinals averaged an 8.54 rating and 104,000 viewers on primetime TV broadcasts in St Louis.

The television commentators lineup includes Chip Caray, Brad Thompson, and Jim Edmonds. Jimmy "The Cat" Hayes serves as dugout reporter during the game as well as on Cardinals Live, a pre- and post-game show. Cardinals Live is hosted in-studio by Alexa Datt along with game analysts and former Cardinals players Al Hrabosky and Rick Ankiel.

Cardinals Kids, a program aimed at the team's younger fans, airs weekly in-season on Fox Sports Midwest. It's hosted by former Cardinals pitcher Brad Thompson, team mascot Fredbird, and Busch Stadium Public Address announcer John "The U-Man" Ulett. The 30-minute show began airing in 2003 and presents team news, player profiles, and Cardinals team history in a kid-friendly manner along with games and trivia.

A weekly magazine program, This Week in Cardinal Nation, airs on St. Louis' NBC affiliate KSDK. Cardinals games had been seen on KSDK (and its predecessor, KSD-TV) from 1947 through 1958, 1963 through 1987, and 2007 until 2010. KPLR-TV was the Cardinals' other over-the-air broadcaster, carrying games from 1959 through 1962 and from 1988 until 2006.

Former Cardinals broadcasters include Jack Buck, Harry Caray, Bob Carpenter, Dizzy Dean, Joe Garagiola  Sr., Dan McLaughlin, and Jay Randolph. Joe Buck, the son of Jack Buck, was an official member of the Cardinals' broadcast team from 1991 until 2007. The younger Buck once served as the lead play-by-play caller for Fox Sports' national Major League Baseball and National Football League broadcasts before joining ESPN as the voice of Monday Night Football in 2022.

Opening Day lineups

Opening Day salaries
Opening Day payrolls for 25-man roster (since 2000): 2018–23 payroll obligations

Notes

References

Further reading

External links

 
 St. Louis Cardinals news (from the St. Louis Post-Dispatch)
 St. Louis Cardinals Team Index (at Baseball Reference)
 St. Louis Cardinals Team Page (at Scout.com)

 
Anheuser-Busch
Busch family
Grapefruit League
Major League Baseball teams
St. Louis Browns
Baseball teams established in 1882
1882 establishments in Missouri